BodyCartography Project is a dance performance duo composed of Olive Bieringa and Otto Ramstad. Their work is influenced by their studies at the Body-Mind Center, where dance is taught based on a somatic movement approach. The pair have created over 150 dance works, including site-specific creations, stage productions, film, and installations. BodyCartography Project makes dances that engage with the vital materiality of the body, embodiment, and interaction of body and space.

History
Olive Bieringa, originally from New Zealand, studied dance at European Dance Development Center in the Netherlands. She went to the US to study with Lisa Nelson and Bonnie Bainbridge Cohen. Otto Ramstad grew up in Minneapolis, MN and began studying with Suzanne River when he was 7 years old.  Bieringa and Ramstad started to work together in 1998 and have been based in Minneapolis, Minnesota since 2001.

In 2001, and again in 2002 and 2003, BodyCartography Project participated in the New Zealand Fringe Festival, winning the Outdoor Award each year and the Pelorous Trust Creativity Award in 2003.  The pair were well received at the Kerry Film Festival in Ireland in 2004.

In 2005, BodyCartography Project won the Dance for Camera prize at the American Dance Festival. In 2006 and again in 2008 they won the Minnesota Sage Award for Outstanding Performance.
 
They were presented with a Brooklyn Arts Exchange Passing It On Award in 2006, and became Public Art St. Paul Sustainable Arts Fellows in 2007. City Pages named them Artists of the Year in 2007, and they won a McKnight Fellowship for Choreographers in 2010.

In 2012, they presented Super Nature at the Walker Art Center, with music by Zeena Parkins.

Super Nature was performed at American Realness Festival in 2013, receiving a positive review from the New York Times. They also performed at the newMoves Contemporary Dance Festival in 2015.  They were named the area's best dance company of the year by City Pages.

In 2015, they received a grant from the Foundation for Contemporary Art.  They presented "closer" in various venues in the Twin Cities, beginning as a series of one-on-one dances and winding up with a full-length production at the Red Eye Theater.  They also sold these one-on-one performances at the Walker Art Center Shop as part of the Intangibles Collection.

References

External links 
 BodyCartography Project
 Body-Mind Centering
Dance in Minnesota